Adam and Company was a trading division of The Royal Bank of Scotland catering for the needs of private bank customers based in the United Kingdom. It offered a range of private banking services including discretionary investment management and financial planning services to high net worth clients in the UK.

The bank was founded in 1983 in Edinburgh, often referred to as the birthplace of Scottish Enlightenment, and one of the leading lights of that era, Adam Smith, published ‘An inquiry into the Nature and Causes of the Wealth of Nations’ in 1776 which revolutionised economic theory. Adam & Company was named after this leading figure of the time.

In 2022, the business was transferred to NatWest Group sister company, Coutts & Co.

History 
The bank was founded in 1983, opening its first branch in Charlotte Square, Edinburgh, Scotland on 29 May 1984. In 1986, Adam and Company acquired London-based Continental Trust (London) Limited; and later established an international arm in Guernsey. Branches in Glasgow, Manchester and Aberdeen were also opened between 1987 and 2005.

In 1993, following substantial foreign-exchange related losses, Adam and Company was acquired by the Royal Bank of Scotland who provided the capital needed to rebuild the Bank's weakened balance sheet. After the Royal Bank of Scotland acquired NatWest in 2000, restructuring of the group saw Adam and Company placed in the bank's Wealth Management Services Division, alongside rival Coutts, the largest private bank in the UK.

In 2002, Adam and Company acquired Stewart Ivory Wealth Management.

During the years until 2012, Adam & Company established itself as a bank for the wealthy. In 2012, Adam & Company became the first UK bank to implement the Avaloq investment and banking platform which paved the way for integration with Coutts and a range of efficiency savings leading to job losses for almost half of the workforce.

In late 2011 the company moved its registered office to a newly refurbished Georgian townhouse at 25 Saint Andrew Square.

In 2014 and as part of a wider and more radical shake-up to the divisional structure of the parent company, Adam & Company, under the leadership of Graham Storrie, was made a subsidiary of Coutts and consolidated into the Commercial and Private Banking division of RBS, under divisional CEO Alison Rose.

In early 2018, the Royal Bank of Scotland Group announced its plans for restructuring to comply with new UK-wide rules on ring-fencing retail banking operations from investment banking operations. As part of this restructuring, all retail banking assets of the Royal Bank of Scotland were transferred to Adam and Company, which was renamed Royal Bank of Scotland. Adam and Company continued as an RBS private banking brand in Scotland, along the same lines as the Drummonds and Child & Co. businesses in England.

In 2022, RBS transferred the banking and lending business to Coutts & Co. using a banking business transfer scheme approved by the Court of Session in Edinburgh under Part VII of the Financial Services and Markets Act 2000.

Office locations 
Adam and Company had four offices in Edinburgh (HO), Glasgow, Aberdeen and London.  The Adam International business in Guernsey closed in 2012, and an office in Manchester closed in 2014 after 15 years of operations.

See also

There are three other private banking brands within the NatWest Group:
 Coutts & Co
 Child & Co
 Drummonds Bank
Both Child & Co and Drummonds ceased operating as banks soon after acquisition by RBS but remain as brands operating on the main PRA licence of RBS where customers enjoy privileged services such as relationship management and discounts on standard retail banking products but where FSCS protection for deposits and other regulatory matters are not distinct from those relating to high street banking customers of RBS.

References

External links 
 

Royal Bank of Scotland
Banks of the United Kingdom
Banks of Scotland
British companies established in 1983
Banks established in 1983
Companies based in Edinburgh
Banking in Great Britain
1983 establishments in Scotland